A referendum to confirm the presidential candidate Joseph Saidu Momoh was held in Sierra Leone on 1 October 1985. It was the country's first direct vote for president. At the time, the country was a one-party state with the All People's Congress as the only legal party. 

Momoh was named as the APC's presidential candidate after retiring president Siaka Stevens persuaded several other hopefuls to stand down. Voters only had the option of approving or rejecting his candidacy. Momoh's candidacy was approved by 99.85% of the votes, with just over 4,000 people voting no.

Results

References

Presidential elections in Sierra Leone
Single-candidate elections
One-party elections
Sierra Leone
1985 in Sierra Leone
Election and referendum articles with incomplete results